Pentagon bus station was the main bus interchange in Chatham, Kent, South East England. It was an integral part of the Pentagon Shopping Centre. Before its closure in 2011, 80% of local services started, terminated or passed through the Centre.

As part of the redevelopment plans for central Chatham, the Pentagon bus station was replaced in October 2011 by the Chatham Waterfront bus station on Globe Lane, adjacent to Military Rd. Space previously used by the bus station will be used to expand the Pentagon Shopping Centre. The new bus shelters have been designed to have living roofs (mainly sedums).

The Pentagon bus station was arranged as a two-lane, one-way, ring road around the outside of the Pentagon Shopping Centre at the upper level. The station had 18 bays, all on the inside of the road around the irregular 5 sided building. Bus access came from street level (The Brook) via one street level ramp and could exit via the same or a second ramp as appropriate.

In order to move the station from the Pentagon centre, Medway Council had to purchase the lease for the site back off Arriva Southern Counties, which was due to hold the lease until 2018. Arriva held the right to use the site as it had taken over Maidstone & District Motor Services, the previous incumbent. Access to the station by other operators has been a cause of historical controversy. The issue was placed within the scope of a 1993 Competition Commission inquiry into The supply of bus services in Mid and West Kent. As a result of the inquiry, M&D were required to undertake to provide equal access at reasonable rates and conditions.

In late 2013, Medway Council planned to turn the disused station into a car park for its employees  but as of 2015 all entrances have been fenced off.

See also

 Arriva Southern Counties
 Pentagon Shopping Centre
 Chatham Waterfront bus station

References

Former bus stations
Bus stations in England
Transport in Medway